C. D. Jathanna (Constantine Devaprasad Jathanna) (Born 6 July 1928, Died 1996) was the fourth Bishop - in - Karnataka Central Diocese headquartered in Bangalore with the Cathedra of the Bishop placed at St. Mark's Cathedral, Bangalore.

Studies

Graduate
Jathanna studied Bachelor of Arts completing it by 1951.  For a year he worked as a Rationing Officer with the Government of Tamil Nadu (erstwhile Government of Madras) before proceeding for spiritual studies at the United Theological College, Bangalore during the years 1952-1955 where he studied along with E. C. John, Victor Premasagar, N. D. Ananda Rao Samuel and others.

Post-graduate
In 1958 he pursued a postgraduate degree, Master of Theology at the University of Virginia, Charlottesville, Virginia entitling his dissertation as Torah and Berith in the Pentateuch.

Research studies
In 1964 Jathanna got a scholarship of the Mission-Academy and went on study leave to the University of Hamburg, Hamburg where he studied Old Testament at the Faculty of Evangelical Theology under Klaus Koch, a direct student of Gerhard von Rad.  In 1967 he was able to complete his doctoral dissertation under the supervision of Professors Hans Joachim Kraus and Marie-Louise Henry which was later published in 1969 under the title The Covenant and covenant making in Pentateuch.

Ecclesiastical career
After completing studies in spirituality at the United Theological College, Bangalore in 1955, Jathanna was the Secretary of the Student Christian Movement (Karnataka Unit) from 1955 through 1957.

From 1959 onwards Jathanna was assigned a Pastoral role and served as an Evangelist before his ordination in 1960.  From 1961 onwards, Jathanna taught at the B. E. M. Theological Seminary in Mangalore (now Karnataka Theological College serving also as Vice-Principal of the Seminary.

After completing doctoral studies in 1967, he was appointed Principal of the Karnataka Theological College, Mangalore.  Jathanna was a member of the Senate of Serampore College (University) and was a member of its Research Committee.  In 1980, Jathanna visited the Andhra Christian Theological College, Hyderabad along with Klaus Koch (who was visiting Professor at the United Theological College, Bangalore as part of the Research Committee of the Senate.

Recognition and honour
John Sadananda, a colleague of Jathanna at the Karnataka Theological College, Mangalore edited a festschrift in honour of Jathanna which was entitled Vision and Reality: Essays in Honour of Constantine D. Jathanna published by the College in 1989.

In 1993, the country's first University, the Senate of Serampore College (University) under the Registrarship of D. S. Satyaranjan conferred the honorary doctorate degree by honoris causa upon Jathanna.

References

Kannada people
20th-century Anglican bishops in India
Anglican bishops of Karnataka Central
1928 births
1996 deaths
Indian Christian theologians
Senate of Serampore College (University) alumni
University of Virginia alumni
University of Hamburg alumni
Indian biblical scholars
Old Testament scholars
Academic staff of the Senate of Serampore College (University)